Tristan Malcolm Knowles, OAM (born 25 April 1983) is an Australian wheelchair basketball player and won a gold medal at the 2008 Beijing Paralympics and silver medal at the 2012 London Paralympics. He competed at 2020 Summer Paralympics, his fifth Games.

Personal
Knowles was born on 25 April 1983 in Wodonga, Victoria. He became an above the knee amputee as a result of cancer. He went to the University of Wollongong where he earned a degree in commerce.  When not playing basketball, he is a financial planning manager with the Commonwealth Bank. He established the Tristan Knowles Kids Cancer Foundation.

Basketball

Knowles first played wheelchair basketball in 1999. He is a 4 point player and plays in the guard-forward position.

State team
Knowles played for the New South Wales U21 state team in the national competition. The state U21 team won the national championships four years in a row with Knowles as the captain.

National team
Knowles's first appearance on the national team was in 2001.

Paralympics

Knowles was part of the silver medal-winning Australia men's national wheelchair basketball team  at the 2004 Summer Paralympics. He was also part of the gold medal-winning Australia men's national wheelchair basketball team at the 2008 Summer Paralympics, for which he received a Medal of the Order of Australia.

In October 2011, Knowles was named as part of the senior national squad that would compete at the Paralympic qualifying tournament for the 2012 Summer Paralympics. At the 2012 Summer Paralympics he was part of the Australian men's wheelchair team that won silver. In 2016, he was selected for the 2016 Summer Paralympics in Rio de Janeiro, his fourth games, where his team, The Rollers, finished sixth.

At the 2020 Tokyo Paralympics, the Rollers finished fifth with a win–loss record of 4–4.

World Championships
Knowles was part of the 2006 national squad that finished third at the World Championships.
In 2009, he was part of the national side that competed at the Rollers World Challenge.  In the match against Japan, he scored 15 points. 
He was a member of the Australia men's national wheelchair basketball team that won the gold medal at the 2010 Wheelchair Basketball World Championship and 2014 Wheelchair Basketball World Championships. In 2018, he was a member of the Rollers that won the bronze medal at 2018 Wheelchair Basketball World Championship in Hamburg, Germany.

Club basketball
Knowles has played professional wheelchair basketball in Australia,  Spain and Italy.   has played with the Wollongong Roller Hawks for 11 years. When playing for the Roller Hawks, he wears the number 9. In 2003, the Wollongong Roller Hawks, competed in the NWBL Championship and won. In the first game of the 2011 season against the Perth Wheelcats, he scored 44 points. His team went on to beat the Perth Wheelcats in the 2011 NWBL Championship. In the finals game, he scored 48 points.

In 2010, Knowles was playing club basketball with Valladolid in Spain.    He was the team's season MVP in 2011.

Recognition
In 2002, Knowles was named the New South Wales Wheelchair Basketballer of the Year. In 2004, Knowles and Brendan Dowler received the Illawarra Mercury Sports Star of the Year Award.

References

External links
 
 Basketball Australia Profile
 
 Tristan Knowles on Sunrise Channel 7 2016

Paralympic wheelchair basketball players of Australia
Paralympic gold medalists for Australia
Paralympic silver medalists for Australia
Amputee category Paralympic competitors
Australian amputees
Wheelchair basketball players at the 2004 Summer Paralympics
Wheelchair basketball players at the 2008 Summer Paralympics
Wheelchair basketball players at the 2012 Summer Paralympics
Wheelchair basketball players at the 2016 Summer Paralympics
Wheelchair basketball players at the 2020 Summer Paralympics
University of Wollongong alumni
Recipients of the Medal of the Order of Australia
1983 births
Living people
Galatasaray S.K. (wheelchair basketball) players
Medalists at the 2004 Summer Paralympics
Medalists at the 2008 Summer Paralympics
Medalists at the 2012 Summer Paralympics
People from Wodonga
ACT Academy of Sport alumni
Paralympic medalists in wheelchair basketball
Sportsmen from Victoria (Australia)
Australian bankers
Australian expatriate basketball people in Spain
Australian expatriate basketball people in Turkey
Australian expatriate basketball people in Italy